Lac de Pétichet is a lake at Saint-Théoffrey in the Isère department of France, 400 m south of the Grand lac de Laffrey.

Petichet, Lac